Yoland Levèque (17 April 1937 – 28 October 2011) was a French boxer. He competed in the middleweight event at the 1960 Summer Olympics in Rome. He lost his opening bout to Yevgeny Feofanov of the Soviet Union.

References

External links
 

1937 births
2011 deaths
Olympic boxers of France
Boxers at the 1960 Summer Olympics
Sportspeople from Somme (department)
French male boxers
Middleweight boxers